In mathematics, the Cartan–Ambrose–Hicks theorem is a theorem of Riemannian geometry, according to which the Riemannian metric is locally determined by the Riemann curvature tensor, or in other words, behavior of the curvature tensor under parallel translation determines the metric.

The theorem is named after Élie Cartan, Warren Ambrose, and his PhD student Noel Hicks. Cartan proved the local version. Ambrose proved a global version that allows for isometries between general Riemannian manifolds with varying curvature, in 1956. This was further generalized by Hicks to general manifolds with affine connections in their tangent bundles, in 1959.

A statement and proof of the theorem can be found in

Introduction 

Let  be connected, complete Riemannian manifolds.

Let , and let

 

be a linear isometry. Now we attempt to extend it to a finite (rather than infinitesimal) patch.

For sufficiently small , the exponential maps

 

are local diffeomorphisms.

 
When is  an isometry? Intuitively, it should be an isometry if it satisfies the two conditions:

If  is an isometry, it must preserve the geodesics. By property of the exponential mapping,  maps it to a geodesic radius of  starting at ,. 

Let  be the parallel transport along  (defined by the Levi-Civita connection), and  be the parallel transport along , then we have the mapping between infinitesimal patches along the two geodesic radii:

Cartan's theorem 

where  are Riemann curvature tensors of .In words, it states that  is an isometry if and only if the only way to preserve its infinitesimal isometry also preserves the Riemannian curvature.

Note that  generally does not have to be a diffeomorphism, but only a locally isometric covering map. However,  must be a global isometry if  is simply connected.

Cartan–Ambrose–Hicks theorem 

 

for all .

Then, if two broken geodesics beginning in  have the same endpoint, then the corresponding broken geodesics (mapped by ) in  also have the same end point. So there exists a map

 

The map  is a locally isometric covering map.

If  is also simply connected, then  is an isometry.

Locally symmetric spaces 

A Riemannian manifold is called locally symmetric if its Riemann curvature tensor is invariant under parallel transport:

 

A simply connected Riemannian manifold is locally symmetric if it is a symmetric space.

From the Cartan–Ambrose–Hicks theorem, we have:

Theorem: Let  be connected, complete, locally symmetric Riemannian manifolds, and let  be simply connected. Let their Riemann curvature tensors be . Let  and

 

Then there exists a locally isometric covering map

 

Classification of space forms

As an application of the Cartan–Ambrose–Hicks theorem, any simply connected, complete Riemannian manifold with constant sectional curvature  is respectively isometric to the n-sphere , the n-Euclidean space , and the n-hyperbolic space .

References 

Riemannian geometry